Simon Oliver Moore (born 15 June 1974) is a former English cricketer.  Moore was a right-handed batsman who bowled right-arm medium pace.  He was born in Oldham, Greater Manchester.

Moore represented the Derbyshire Cricket Board in 2 List A matches.  The first came against  Wales Minor Counties in the 1999 NatWest Trophy.  His second came against the Middlesex Cricket Board in the 1st round of the 2003 Cheltenham & Gloucester Trophy which was played in 2002.  In his 2 List A matches, he scored 22 runs at a batting average of 11, with a high score of 13.  In the field he took a single catch.  With the ball he took 4 wickets at a bowling average of 28.25, with best figures of 2/46.

References

External links
Simon Moore at Cricinfo
Simon Moore at CricketArchive

1974 births
Living people
Cricketers from Oldham
English cricketers
Derbyshire Cricket Board cricketers